Peroxisome biogenesis factor 1, also known as PEX1, is a protein which in humans is encoded by the PEX1 gene.

This gene encodes a member of the AAA protein family, a large group of ATPases associated with diverse cellular activities. This protein is cytoplasmic but is often anchored to a peroxisomal membrane where it forms a heteromeric complex and plays a role in the import of proteins into peroxisomes and peroxisome biogenesis. Mutations in this gene have been associated with complementation group 1 peroxisomal disorders such as neonatal adrenoleukodystrophy, infantile Refsum disease, and Zellweger syndrome.

Interactions 

PEX1 has been shown to interact with PEX6 and PEX26.

Related diseases 
Mutations in the genes encoding PEX1, along with PEX6, are the leading causes of peroxisomal biogenesis disorders, such as Zellweger Syndrome spectrum, infantile Refsum disease, and neonatal adrenoleukodystrophy. These genetic diseases are autosomal recessive and occur in 1 of every 50,000 births. Because of the autosomal recessive inheritance of Zellweger Syndrome, PEX1 is usually found in carrier screening gene panels. A very common PEX1 variant, Gly843Asp, is a mild allele well-reported in the literature.

References

Further reading

External links 
  GeneReviews/NCBI/NIH/UW entry on Peroxisome Biogenesis Disorders, Zellweger Syndrome Spectrum
 OMIM entries on Peroxisome Biogenesis Disorders, Zellweger Syndrome Spectrum